DNA replication licensing factor MCM3 is a protein that in humans is encoded by the MCM3 gene.

Function 

The protein encoded by this gene is one of the highly conserved mini-chromosome maintenance proteins (MCM) that are involved in the initiation of eukaryotic genome replication. The hexameric protein complex formed by MCM proteins is a key component of the pre-replication complex (pre-RC) and may be involved in the formation of replication forks and in the recruitment of other DNA replication related proteins. This protein is a subunit of the protein complex that consists of MCM2-7. It has been shown to interact directly with MCM5/CDC46. This protein also interacts with, and thus is acetylated by MCM3AP, a chromatin-associated acetyltransferase. The acetylation of this protein inhibits the initiation of DNA replication and cell cycle progression.

Interactions 

MCM3 has been shown to interact with:
 CDC45-related protein,
 CDC6, 
 DBF4, 
 MCM2 
 MCM3AP, 
 MCM5, 
 MCM7, 
 ORC4L,  and
 ORC5L.

See also 
Mini Chromosome Maintenance

References

Further reading